Domingo "Menggie" Cobarrubias (August 10, 1951 – March 26, 2020) was a Filipino actor who appeared in approximately 200 television shows and films.

Cobarrubias received a Gawad Urian Award for Best Supporting Actor for his role in the 1979 film Jaguar. He also won the Best Actor award in the 2014 QCinema International Film Festival for his performance in Mauban: Ang Resiko.

Death
Cobarrubias died on March 26, 2020, from complications of pneumonia, at the age of 68. Before his death, a COVID-19 test was administered. On April 1, 2020, five days after his death, his test came back positive for the disease.

Filmography

Film

Television

Theatre

References

External links

1953 births
2020 deaths
Filipino male film actors
Filipino male television actors
Deaths from pneumonia in the Philippines
Deaths from the COVID-19 pandemic in the Philippines
GMA Network personalities
ABS-CBN personalities
TV5 (Philippine TV network) personalities